The Lee County School District—commonly called Lee County Schools— is the public school district for Lee County, Alabama, United States, excluding the parts of the county in the Auburn, Opelika, and Phenix City city limits. Students in the Lee County Schools attend schools in one of four attendance areas: Beauregard, Beulah, Loachapoka, and Smiths Station. In 2010, the district enrolled 9,738 students in grades K-12.

Attendance areas

Beauregard
 Beauregard Elementary School (K-4)
 Sanford Middle School (5-8)
 Beauregard High School (9-12)

Beulah
 Beulah Elementary School (K-6)
 Beulah High School (7-12)

Loachapoka
 Loachapoka Elementary School (K-6)
 Loachapoka High School (7-12)

Smiths Station
 East Smiths Station Elementary School (K-6)
 South Smiths Station Elementary School (K-6)
 West Smiths Station Elementary School (K-6)
 Wacoochee Elementary School (K-6)
 Smiths Station Junior High School (7-8)
 Smiths Station Freshmen Center (9)
 Smiths Station High School (10-12)

See also

List of school districts in Alabama
Auburn City Schools

References

External links
Official homepage

School districts in Alabama
Education in Lee County, Alabama